James Brown (1847–unknown) was a Sergeant in the United States Army who received the Medal of Honor for his actions during the Indian Wars.

Early life
James was born in Wexford, Ireland, in 1847. He was a Sergeant in Company F, 5th US Cavalry when he displayed actions near the Davidson Canyon, Arizona, that would earn him the Medal of Honor.

Medal of Honor
Rank and organization: Sergeant, Company F, 5th US Cavalry. Place and date: Near Davidson Canyon, Arizona Territory, August 27, 1872. Birth: Wexford, Ireland. Date of issue: December 4, 1874.

Citation:
In command of a detachment of four men, defeated a superior force.

Later life
James received the Medal of Honor on December 4, 1874, and the date of his death is unknown, as well as his final resting place.

See also
 List of Medal of Honor recipients
 List of Medal of Honor recipients for the Indian Wars

References

1847 births
People from Wexford, County Wexford
Recipients of the Medal of Honor
American Indian Wars recipients of the Medal of Honor
Year of death missing